Ernest Renshaw and William Renshaw defeated Ernest Lewis and Teddy Williams 6–3, 6–1, 1–6, 6–4 to win the inaugural gentlemen's doubles tennis title at the 1884 Wimbledon Championships.

Draw

Draw

References

External links

Gentlemen's Doubles
Wimbledon Championship by year – Men's doubles